A rearguard is a  military detachment protecting the rear of a larger military formation, especially when retreating from a pursuing enemy force. It may also refer to:
 Rear Guard (video game), a computer game released in 1982
 The Rear Guard (poem), by Siegfried Sassoon